Montaña Alavesa  , full Cuadrilla de Campezo-Montaña Alavesa, is a comarca of the province of Álava, Spain. It is located to the southeast of Álava and covers an area of 534.87 km² with a population of 3179 people (2010). The capital lies in Santa Cruz de Campezo.

It includes the municipalities of Arraya-Maestu, Bernedo, Campezo, Lagrán, Peñacerrada and Valle de Arana as well as the lands of the Parzonería de Encía and the communities of Laño, Pipaón and Peñacerrada. It brings together a total of 47 locations.

Population
Montaña Alavesa is a mountainous region and sparsely populated. It has lost over half its population throughout the twentieth century, from the more than 8,000 people in 1900 to the current population. 35.7% of the working population is employed in agriculture. 32% is devoted to industrial activity. Thanks to rising tourism the services industry is presenting an important area of development.

Municipalities and towns
The municipalities and towns (municipality capitals in bold) that make up Montaña Alavesa are:

(*) Not municipalities

References

External links
 Montaña Alavesa on Google Maps
 Cuadrilla de Campezo-Montaña Alavesa

Comarcas of Álava